Timothy Adès (born 1941) is an English poet and translator.

Biography
Adès was born in Esher, Surrey. He is of Syrian Jewish origin.

He was educated as a King's Scholar at Eton College, where he won the Newcastle Scholarship in 1959, at Balliol College, Oxford and at INSEAD, Fontainebleau. He has studied both classics and business. In 1963, during his time at Balliol, he was part of the team that reached the final of the first series of University Challenge, losing to Leicester University. As a translator, he works mainly with French, German and Spanish rhymed poems, translating them into English.

His wife is the art historian Professor Dawn Adès, CBE, FBA. Composer Thomas Adès is one of their three sons.

Career
He is a past winner of the John Dryden Prize with Victor Hugo's Moscow, Waterloo, St Helena and the TLS Premio Valle-Inclán Prize with Homer in Cuernavaca by Alfonso Reyes, among other awards.

Bibliography

 Victor Hugo, How to be a Grandfather
 Jean Cassou, 33 Sonnets of the Resistance 
 Jean Cassou, The Madness of Amadis
 Victor Hugo, The Big Story of the Lion
 Alberto Arvelo Torrealba, Florentino and the Devil
 Robert Desnos, Storysongs/Chantefables
 Robert Desnos, Surrealist, Lover, Resistant
 William Shakespeare, Loving by Will

References

1941 births
Living people
English translators
20th-century British translators
Alumni of Balliol College, Oxford
Contestants on University Challenge